Fort George was the name of five forts in what is now the state of New York.

The first Fort George was built in 1626 in the Dutch colony of New Amsterdam and named Fort Amsterdam. The British Army renamed it Fort James in 1664. It was briefly reoccupied by the Dutch from 1673 to 1674 as Fort Willem Hendrick. The British renamed it Fort William Henry in 1691, Fort Anne or Queen's Fort in 1703, and finally Fort George in 1714. The north side bastions and ramparts were destroyed in the American Revolutionary War in 1776 by the Americans and finally demolished in 1790. The site is now the location of the Alexander Hamilton U.S. Custom House in Lower Manhattan.

A second Fort George was built by the British in 1755 at Oswego, New York, but it was destroyed by the French commander Louis-Joseph de Montcalm in 1756. The site is now Montcalm Park, bordered by West Schulyer Street, Montcalm Street and West 6th Street.

A third Fort George was built in Lake George, New York, in 1755. It was destroyed in 1777 and abandoned in 1780. It was located southeast of Fort William Henry facing Lake George, in the wooded area within Lake George Battlefield Park.

A fourth Fort George was an encampment built on Staten Island around 1777 in the area of St. George, Staten Island, likely Fort Hill.

The last Fort George was built in 1776 in New York City on Fort George Hill, near the current intersection of Audubon Avenue and West 192nd Street in Upper Manhattan. Briefly named Fort Clinton and finally Fort George, from 1895 to 1914 it was the site of the Fort George Amusement Park and is now the location of George Washington Educational Campus and part of Highbridge Park. Fort George Hill is also the name of a present-day street in the area. The neighborhood surrounding the hill is called Fort George and is considered a subneighborhood of Washington Heights. It is generally agreed to run from West 181st Street to Dyckman Street east of Broadway to the Harlem River.

References

External link

Buildings and structures demolished in 1780
George
George
George
1626 establishments in North America
1626 establishments in the Dutch Empire